The CBC Tower, also known as the WesTower Transmission Tower, was a  guyed mast (now  after its reconstruction)  for FM- and TV-transmission located atop Mont-Carmel near Shawinigan, Quebec, Canada. The tower was built in 1972 and it served for several decades as Quebec's primary CBC transmission point and also served several radio and television stations for the Trois-Rivières market.

2001 Incident
On April 22, 2001 a lone pilot, Gilbert Paquette, flew his Cessna 150 into the tower and was killed. The fuselage of the plane remained wedged in the upper part of the tower, with the pilot's body inside. The crash also knocked the tower several metres off balance. It was decided that due to the structural damage and the need to recover the pilot's body the mast would have to be demolished. Several days later a controlled implosion brought the tower down, not damaging the several buildings nearby. At the time, it was the tallest structure to have ever been demolished with explosives.

In July 2003, a new mast broadcasting with over double the effective radiated power of the original mast (from 4,386 watts to 9,300 watts) was built exactly at the same place, on the same base.

See also 
 List of masts

References

External links 
 Implosion World: "Freak Accident Leads to Record-Setting Blast"

Radio masts and towers
Buildings and structures in Shawinigan
Transmitter sites in Canada
Towers in Quebec
Canadian Broadcasting Corporation
Buildings and structures demolished by controlled implosion
Buildings and structures demolished in 2001
Towers completed in 1972
1972 establishments in Quebec
2001 disestablishments in Quebec
Demolished buildings and structures in Canada